1998 in the Philippines details events of note that happened in the Philippines in the year 1998.

The year was also designated for the country's year-long 100th centennial anniversary of the Philippine Independence, as known by its theme, "100 Kalayaan: Kayamanan ng Bayan (1898-1998)".

Incumbents

 President
Fidel Ramos (Lakas) (until June 30)
Joseph Estrada (PMP) (starting June 30)
 Vice President
Joseph Estrada (PMP) (until June 30)
Gloria Macapagal Arroyo (Lakas) (starting June 30)
 Senate President
Ernesto Maceda (until January 26)
Neptali Gonzales (January 26-June 30)
Marcelo Fernan (starting July 27)
 House Speaker
Jose de Venecia (until June 30)
Manny Villar (starting July 27)
 Chief Justice
Andres Narvasa (until November 30)
Hilario Davide (starting November 30)
 Philippine Congress
10th Congress of the Philippines (until June 5)
11th Congress of the Philippines (starting July 27)

Events

January
 January 3 – A power interruption affects the entire Luzon for almost 7 hours, caused by a broken power line after a Meralco utility post has fallen in Laguna.

February
 February 2 – Cebu Pacific Flight 387 crashes on the slopes between Mount Sumagaya and Mount Lumot in Claveria, Misamis Oriental, killing all 104 people on board. It is once considered as the country's worst air accident since 1964, before another one to happen in 2000.
 February 11 – Talisay becomes a city in the province of Negros Occidental through ratification of Republic Act 8489 approved on the same date.
 February 14 – RA 8528 is enacted, amending RA 7720 and downgrading the status of Santiago from an independent component city to a component city of Isabela. The law would be declared unconstitutional by the Supreme Court in 1999.
 February 23 – RA 8535 creating the City of Novaliches is signed into law.
 Late February to early March – A malaria outbreak in two islands in Siasi, Sulu causes the reported deaths of more than 140 residents.

March
 March 7
 Majority of voters in the Cordillera Administrative Region reject the creation of an autonomous region in the second plebiscite for their autonomy, as mandated by the Republic Act No. 8438, with Apayao as the only province to vote for it.
 Samal becomes a city in the province of Davao del Norte through ratification of Republic Act 8471 which was approved on January 30.
 Tagum becomes a city in the province of Davao del Norte through ratification of Republic Act 8472 which was approved on January 30.
 March 14 – Passi becomes a city in the province of Iloilo through ratification of Republic Act 8469 which was approved on January 30.
 March 20 – San Fernando becomes a city in the province of La Union through ratification of Republic Act 8509 which was approved on February 13.
 March 21
Calapan becomes a city in the province of Oriental Mindoro through ratification of Republic Act 8475 which was approved on February 2.
Urdaneta becomes a city in the province of Pangasinan through ratification of Republic Act 8480 which was approved on February 10.
Victorias becomes a city in the province of Negros Occidental through ratification of Republic Act 8488 which was approved on February 11.
 March 22
Kidapawan becomes a city in the province of Cotabato through ratification of Republic Act 8500 which was approved on February 12.
Malaybalay becomes a city in the province of Bukidnon through ratification of Republic Act 8490 which was approved on February 11.
Parañaque becomes a highly urbanized city in Metro Manila through ratification of Republic Act 8507 which was approved on February 13.

April
 April 4 – Antipolo becomes a city in Rizal province through ratification of Republic Act 8508 which was approved on February 13.
 April 19 – Tarlac becomes a city in the province of Tarlac through ratification of Republic Act 8593 which was approved on March 12.

May
 May 11 – Synchronized national and local elections were held.
 May 16 – A fire guts the Lung Center of the Philippines, wherein at least 22 patients die, as well as the adjacent National Kidney and Transplant Institute, in Quezon City.

June
 June 6 – Carmela Arcolas–Gamboa of Negros Occidental, was crowned Miss Philippines Centennial 1998.
 June 12 – The Philippines celebrates the centennial of its independence.
 June 30 – Former vice president Joseph Estrada is sworn in as the 13th president of the Philippines, succeeding Fidel Ramos. Senator Gloria Macapagal Arroyo also sworn as tenth vice president of the Philippines as the latter's successor.
 June–September – Dry spell felt in 16 regions amid country's four-year growth, with ₱9 billion worth of agricultural damages.

July
 Early July – Department of Agriculture reports that the drought and pest infestation to crops in Southern Mindanao region between November 1997 and June 1998 have affected some 254,000 hectares of farmlands, have destroyed 360,037 metric tons of crops worth at least -billion; rice and corn lands are the severely damaged.

September
 September 18 – Passenger ferry MV Princess of the Orient, taking its Manila–Cebu route at the height of Typhoon Vicki (Gading), sinks at sea off Fortune Island, Nasugbu, Batangas; 150 are either reportedly dead or missing.
 September 23 – Philippine Airlines (PAL) suspends its operations for days effective midnight, as it has announced on Sept. 17 to "permanently" halt, as a result of the Asian financial crisis and industrial action by its unions. Two separate strikes have been staged, by approximately 600 pilots in June, on the claims of unfair labor practice and union-busting by PAL, affecting PAL's operations; and by almost 2,000 union members in July, following the June 15 retrenchment of about 5,000 employees as part of its measure to counter financial losses. Pres. Estrada has made a series of interventions in an effort to resolve the labor dispute until certain agreements are made between PAL Employees Association and the airline management. On Oct. 7, PAL partially resumes operations, as announced by Pres. Estrada, Sept. 28. Supreme Court would uphold in 2016 the dismissal of 24 PAL pilots, and in 2018 the retrenchment of some 1,400 cabin crew.

October
 October 6 – Supreme Court votes, 8–5, to acquit former First Lady Imelda Marcos and to reverse a 1993 Sandiganbayan verdict convicting her of graft in connection with the construction of the Philippine General Hospital.
 October 14–15 – Super typhoon Zeb (Iliang) landfalls in Isabela and lashes through Northern Luzon as well as parts of Nueva Ecija and Rizal; causing massive damages worth around a billion pesos; reported death toll is 83.
 October 21–23 – Super typhoon Babs (Loleng) landfalls in Catanduanes and Aurora and rampages across Metro Manila and provinces in Central and Southern Luzon, Eastern Visayas, Negros as well as Baguio and parts of Ilocos Sur; confirmed death toll is 221; damages cost around ₱3-billion in total.

December
 December 3 – A fire devastates private orphanage Bahay Kalinga, run by women's organization Asociacion de Damas de Filipinas Inc., in Paco, Manila, with at least 30 people confirmed dead, mostly children who have been admitted there.
 December 18 – An encounter between Abu Sayyaf founding leader and the country's most wanted outlaw, Abdurajak Janjalani, with 20 rebels, and the 12-member government forces, occurred in Lamitan, Basilan; Janjalani and two of his men are killed, while two government men are killed and two are reported missing.
 December 30 – Valenzuela becomes a highly urbanized city in Metro Manila through ratification of Republic Act 8526 which was approved on February 14.

Holidays

As per Executive Order No. 292, chapter 7 section 26, the following are regular holidays and special days, approved on July 25, 1987. Note that in the list, holidays in bold are "regular holidays" and those in italics are "nationwide special days".

 January 1 – New Year's Day
 April 9:
 Maundy Thursday
 Araw ng Kagitingan (Day of Valor)
 April 10 – Good Friday
 May 1 – Labor Day
 June 12 – Independence Day 
 August 30 – National Heroes Day
 November 1 –  All Saints Day
 November 30 – Bonifacio Day
 December 25 – Christmas Day
 December 30 – Rizal Day
 December 31 – Last Day of the Year

In addition, several other places observe local holidays, such as the foundation of their town. These are also "special days."

Television

Sports
 January 17 – The Tanduay Gold Rhum Masters achieves their 6th title of the PBL after their winning against AGFA HDC Films in Game 5 of the 1998 PBL All-Filipino Cup Finals, 82–76.
 March 7 – The Inauguration games of the Metropolitan Basketball Association is held at Don Narciso Ramos Sports Complex in Lingayen, Pangasinan. 
 May 8 – The Alaska Milkmen regains the 1998 PBA All-Filipino Cup crown with a 4–3 series victory against the San Miguel Beermen and repeated as back-to-back title, Alaska winning their 8th PBA title.
 July 6 – The Tanduay Centennial Rhum Masters are crowned as the PBL Basketball champions of the 1998 Yakult PBL Centennial Cup after beating Batang Red Bull in the Game 3 of the finals series, 71–65. and also breaking its seventh title drought.
 August 14 – The Alaska Milkmen wins their 9th straight PBA title, defeating the San Miguel Beermen for the second time in the season, winning in six games.
 October 6 – The Mobiline Phone Pals wins the PBA Centennial Cup title, defeating the Formula Shell Super Unleaded in winning the overtime 67–66.
 October 31 – The Pampanga Dragons wins as the first MBA champions, winning against Negros Slashers 4–1. The Dragons clinch the first MBA national championship.
 December 6–20 – The Philippines participates in the 1998 Asian Games held in Bangkok, Thailand The country ranks 21st with one gold medal, five silver medals and 12 bronze medals with a total of 18 over-all medals.
 December 9 – Formula Shell Super Unleaded wins their third PBA title and their first in six years, with a 4–3 series victory over the Mobiline Phone Pals.

Births
 January 4 – Liza Soberano, actress
 January 10 – Ayra Mariano, actress
 January 24 - JC Alcantara, actor
 February 3 – James Teng, actor
 February 10 – Donny Pangilinan, actor
 February 16 – Jack Reid, actor and commercial model
 February 24 – Mariel Pamintuan, actress
 March 14 – Elaine Duran, singer
 March 27 – BJ Forbes, actor
 March 29 – Alice de Leon, member of MNL48
 March 30 – Janella Salvador, actress
 April 16 – Paul Salas, actor
 May 4 – Camille Trinidad, vlogger
 May 15 – 
 Chloe Isleta, swimmer
 Kokoy de Santos, actor, singer, dancer and commercial model
 May 18 – Eunice Lagusad, actress and vlogger
 May 22 – Jai Asuncion, vlogger
 May 25 – Ricci Rivero, actor and basketball player
 May 26 – Wealand Ferrer
 May 28 – Luis Gabriel Moreno, archer and Youth Olympic Games medalist
 May 29 – Riva Quenery, actress, vlogger, singer and dancer
 June 3 – Markus Paterson, actor
 June 22 – Maureen Wroblewitz, Asia's Next Top Model winner and TV co-host
 August 1 – Barbie Imperial, actress
 August 4 – Jayzam Manabat, vlogger
 August 11 – Claire Castro, actress
 August 19 – Ella Guevara, actress
 August 21 – Prince Villanueva, actor
 August 23 – Russell Reyes, member of BoybandPH
 August 24 – Sofia Andres, actress
 September 1 – Argel Saycon, actor
 September 21 – Miguel Tanfelix, actor
 October 10 – Nash Aguas, actor
 November 10 – Renz Valerio, actor
 November 11 – Carlo Lacana, actor
 November 22 – Jane de Leon, actress
 December 2 – Gabbi Garcia, actress and endorser
 December 9 – Mika Dela Cruz, actress
 December 11 – Zeinab Harake, vlogger
 December 26 – Ashley Ortega, actress

Deaths
 January 9 – Charito Solis, actress (b. 1935)
 January 14 – Arturo Enrile, Secretary of Transportation and Communications and former Chief of Staff of the Armed Forces of the Philippines (b. 1940)
 March 31 – DJ Dejarlo, Filipino professional basketball player and MBA player
 April – Pancho Magalona, Philippine actor (b. 1921)
 May 14 – Husni Mohammad, vice mayor of Tuburan, Basilan
 June 11 – Leopoldo Salcedo, actor (b. 1912)
 August 27 – Babalu, actor and comedian (b. 1942)
 September 1 – Francisco Coching, Filipino comic books illustrator and writer (b. 1919)
 September 6 – Ric Segreto, recording artist (b. 1952)
 September 26 – Rogelio Abeleda, vice mayor of Mamburao, Occidental Mindoro
 October 9 – Anthony Alonzo, Filipino actor and politician (b. 1948)
 October 23 – Adrian Gonzales, Filipino comic book artist (b. 1937)
 November 21 – Gen. Fabian Ver, former Chief of Staff of the Armed Forces of the Philippines.
 December 17 – Alberto Jover Piamonte, fourth Archbishop of Jaro in the Philippines (b. 1934)
 December 18 – Abdurajak Abubakar Janjalani, chief founder and leader of Abu Sayyaf (b. 1959)
 December 24 – Aurora Aquino, opposition figure during the Marcos administration and mother of former Sen. Benigno Aquino Jr. (b. 1910)
Unknown date
 Mariano Tolentino, Olympic Basketball Player (b. 1928)
 Manuel C. Herrera, Filipino judge (b. 1924)

References

 
1998 in Southeast Asia
Philippines
1990s in the Philippines
Years of the 20th century in the Philippines